The Milwaukee Brewers are a Major League Baseball (MLB) franchise based in Milwaukee, Wisconsin. Established in Seattle, Washington, as the Seattle Pilots in 1969, the team became the Milwaukee Brewers after relocating to Milwaukee in 1970. The franchise played in the American League (AL) until 1998 when it moved to the National League (NL) in conjunction with a major league realignment. This list documents players and personnel who have won MLB awards or been selected for MLB All-Star teams.

Four Brewers have won the Most Valuable Player Award: Ryan Braun, Rollie Fingers, Christian Yelich, and Robin Yount. Three have won the Cy Young Award: Corbin Burnes, Rollie Fingers, and Pete Vuckovich. Three have won the Rookie of the Year Award: Ryan Braun, Pat Listach, and Devin Williams. None have won the Manager of the Year Award. Two have won the Hank Aaron Award: Prince Fielder and Christian Yelich. Dave Parker is the only Brewer to win the Edgar Martínez Award. Two have won the Rolaids Relief Man Award: John Axford and Rollie Fingers. Two others have won the Trevor Hoffman Award: Josh Hader and Devin Williams. Cecil Cooper is the only Brewer to win the Roberto Clemente Award. Six have won the Rawlings Gold Glove Award. Two have won the Wilson Defensive Player of the Year Award. Ten have won the Silver Slugger Award. Five have been selected for All-MLB Teams. Eight have won the Player of the Month Award. Five have won the Pitcher of the Month Award. Six have won the Rookie of the Month Award. One broadcaster has won the Ford C. Frick Award: Bob Uecker.

Ryan Braun won seven MLB year-end awards during his 2007 to 2020 Brewers career, more than any other player in franchise history. He is followed by Cecil Cooper, Christian Yelich, and Robin Yount with six each. Braun was also selected for the MLB All-Star Game six times, more than any other Brewer. His is followed by Cecil Cooper and Paul Molitor (5); Josh Hader, Don Money, and Ben Sheets (4); Prince Fielder, Ben Oglivie, Dan Plesac, and Robin Yount (3); Corbin Burnes, Rollie Fingers, Carlos Gómez, Corey Hart, Carlos Lee, Jonathan Lucroy, Francisco Rodríguez, Richie Sexson, Ted Simmons, Greg Vaughn, Brandon Woodruff and Christian Yelich (2).

Seventy Brewers have been selected to play in the MLB All-Star Game. Of these, 22 have been selected on more than one occasion. Prince Fielder is the only Brewer to win the All-Star Game Most Valuable Player Award. Of the eight Brewers selected to participate in the Home Run Derby held during the All-Star break, Fielder is the only Brewer to win the contest.

Key

Awards

Most Valuable Player Award

Four Brewers have won the Major League Baseball Most Valuable Player Award—two in the American League and two in the National League. Robin Yount is the only Brewer to win the award twice.

Cy Young Award

Three Brewers have won the Cy Young Award—two in the American League and one in the National League.

Rookie of the Year Award

Three Brewers have won the Major League Baseball Rookie of the Year Award—one in the American League and two in the National League.

Hank Aaron Award

Two Brewers have won the Hank Aaron Award. Christian Yelich is the only Brewer to win the award twice.

Edgar Martínez Award

One Brewer won the Edgar Martínez Outstanding Designated Hitter Award.

Rolaids Relief Man Award

Two Brewers won the Rolaids Relief Man Award.

Trevor Hoffman Award

Two Brewers have won the Trevor Hoffman National League Reliever of the Year Award.

Roberto Clemente Award

One Brewer has won the Roberto Clemente Award.

Rawlings Gold Glove Award

Six Brewers have won the Rawlings Gold Glove Award. George Scott and Cecil Cooper are the only Brewers to win the award multiple times. Cumulatively, the Brewers have won seven at first base, one at shortstop, and three at outfield for a total of 11 Gold Gloves.

Wilson Defensive Player of the Year Award

Two Brewers have won the Wilson Defensive Player of the Year Award. Carlos Gómez is the only Brewer to win the award twice.

Silver Slugger Award

Ten Brewers have won the Silver Slugger Award. Cumulatively, the Brewers have won 10 at outfield, 5 at first base, 3 at designated hitter, 2 at shortstop, and 1 at pitcher for a total of 21 Silver Sluggers. Ryan Braun, Cecil Cooper, Prince Fielder, Paul Molitor, Christian Yelich, and Robin Yount are the only Brewers to win the award multiple times.

All-MLB Team

Five Brewers have been named to All-MLB Teams—two to the first team and two to the second team.

Player of the Month Award

Eight Brewers have won the Major League Baseball Player of the Month Award. Ryan Braun, Cecil Cooper, Prince Fielder, and Robin Yount are the only Brewers to win the award on multiple occasions.

Pitcher of the Month Award

Five Brewers have won the Major League Baseball Pitcher of the Month Award. Cal Eldred and CC Sabathia are the only Brewers to win the award twice.

Rookie of the Month Award

Six Brewers have won the Major League Baseball Rookie of the Month Award. Ryan Braun is the only Brewer to win the award twice.

Ford C. Frick Award

One Brewers broadcaster has won the Ford C. Frick Award.

All-Stars

Seventy Brewers have been selected to play in the Major League Baseball All-Star Game. Twenty-two have been selected on more than one occasion.

All-Star Game Most Valuable Player Award

One Brewer has won the Major League Baseball All-Star Game Most Valuable Player Award.

Home Run Derby participants

Eight Brewers have been selected to participate in the Home Run Derby held during the All-Star break. Prince Fielder, Richie Sexson, and Greg Vaughn are the only Brewers to appear in multiple Home Run Derbies. Fielder is the only Brewer to win the contest.

Minor league system

Robin Yount Performance Award

The Brewers have presented Player and Pitcher of the Year Awards to their top minor leaguers—one player and one pitcher—since 1999. The awards were renamed in honor of Robin Yount in 2003. Taylor Green, Ben Hendrickson, and Ben Sheets are the only recipients to win two awards.

Player of the Year Award

Pitcher of the Year Award

Other achievements

Baseball Hall of Famers
Eight Brewers have been inducted in the National Baseball Hall of Fame and Museum.

Retired numbers

The Brewers have retired five uniform numbers in honor of its former players and executives. This ensures that the number will be associated with one person of particular importance to the team. Additionally, the number 42 has been retired throughout professional baseball in honor of Jackie Robinson.

Milwaukee Brewers Wall of Honor

The Milwaukee Brewers Wall of Honor at American Family Field is an exhibit that commemorates players, coaches, executives, and broadcasters who have made significant contributions to the team and meet set criteria regarding career milestones or service time.

American Family Field Walk of Fame

The American Family Field Walk of Fame at American Family Field is an exhibit that commemorates players, coaches, executives, and broadcasters who have made significant contributions to Major League Baseball in Milwaukee. It covers the entire history of the Brewers since 1970 and that of the Milwaukee Braves, who played in the city from 1953 to 1965.

See also
Baseball awards
List of Major League Baseball awards
Wisconsin Athletic Hall of Fame

References 

Awards
Mil